Jaíba Biological Reserve is a biological reserve in Minas Gerais, Brazil.

Location

The reserve is in the São Francisco River Basin.
It is part of the  Jaiba Sistema de Áreas Protegidas (SAP), which was created as a condition of approval of the Jaiba Irrigation Project. 
The SAP also includes two Environment Protection Areas totalling .
In 2010 a single advisory board was established to oversee all the conservation units of the Jaiba SAP.

Environment

Annual rainfall averages , mostly falling in the summer.
The reserve contains deciduous forest (Dry Forest) that is home to agoutis, lizards, monkeys and various species of birds.
It belongs to the Caatinga domain.
A 2007 study of the vegetation found 27 families with 55 species.
15 species were from the family Fabaceae and 4 species from the family Nyctaginaceae.
The largest number of individuals was from the Tabebuia ochracea species, followed by Combretum leprosum and Terminalia fagifolia.

Conservation
As of 2009 the State Biological Reserve was a "strict nature reserve" under IUCN protected area category Ia.
There are trails in the reserve that are often used by students at technical schools in the region, and it is also an important research area.

References

Sources

1973 establishments in Brazil
Biological reserves of Brazil
Protected areas of Minas Gerais
Protected areas established in 1973